John Davies of Hereford (c. 1565 – July 1618) was a writing-master and an Anglo-Welsh poet. He referred to himself as John Davies of Hereford (after the city where he was born) in order to distinguish himself from others of the same name, particularly the contemporary poet Sir John Davies (1569–1626).

Davies wrote very copiously on theological and philosophical themes, some of which brought proto-scientific ideas into the public arena.   He also wrote many epigrams on his contemporaries which have some historical interest. John Davies died in London.

Davies was a friend of Edmund Ashfield, and wrote in an epigram that he nearly accompanied Ashfield on his journey to Scotland in 1599.

Works

Mirum in Modum, a Glimpse of God's Glory and the Soul's Shape (1602)
Microcosmos (1603)
Wittes Pilgrimage (1605?)
Bien Venu (1606)
Summa Totalis (1607)
Humours Heav'n on Earth (1609)
The Holy Roode (1609)
The Scourge of Folly (1611)
The Muse's Sacrifice (1612)
The Picture of a Happy Man (1612)
A Select Second Husband for Sir Thomas Overburie's Wife (1616)
Wit's Bedlam (1617)

These rare editions were compiled by Reverend Alexander Balloch Grosart (1827–1899) into a two-volume edition privately printed in one hundred copies in 1875 and 1878 at the Edinburgh University Press by Thomas and Archibald Constable as part of the "Chertsey Worthies' library" subscription series. The complete works of John Davies of Hereford (15??-1618) was "for the first time collected and edited: with memorial introduction, notes and illustrations, glossarial index, and portrait and facsimile, &c." Grosart indicated for several of the poems that there was only one extant copy known.

A Lover's Complaint

In a 2007 monograph, Shakespeare, "A Lover's Complaint," and John Davies of Hereford, Brian Vickers attributes to Davies the poem "A Lover's Complaint", which was published by Thomas Thorpe with Shakespeare's Sonnets in 1609. This attribution goes against scholarly consensus, and in particular studies by Kenneth Muir, Eliot Slater and MacDonald P. Jackson, but is based on both a detailed demonstration of the non-Shakespearean nature of the poem and a list of numerous verbal parallels—such as 'What brest so cold that is not warmed heare' and 'What heart's so cold that is not set on fire'—between the Complaint and the known works of Davies. On Vickers's attribution it was omitted from the 2007 RSC Shakespeare Complete Works, a decision Jackson called a mistake in his RES review of Vickers's book, arguing, among other reservations, that "Evidence that, in poems undoubtedly his, Davies exhibits an intimacy with Shakespeare's works equal to that of the author of 'A Lover's Complaint' is very meagre."

References

Specific

External links

John Davies of Hereford Encyclopædia Britannica
Complete Works of John Davies of Hereford  Vol. 1, Vol. 2

1560s births
1618 deaths
People from Hereford
Anglo-Welsh poets
17th-century English theologians
17th-century Anglican theologians
17th-century English writers
English male poets
17th-century Welsh poets
17th-century English male writers
17th-century Welsh theologians